Flávia de Oliveira (born 17 July 1983 in Londrina, Brazil) is a Brazilian fashion model who participated in the 2006, 2007, 2008, 2010, and 2011 Victoria's Secret Fashion Shows. She has also modeled in shows for Dior, Valentino, Missoni, Gucci, Balenciaga, and Chanel. She has appeared in advertising for Blumarine, Dolce & Gabbana, Michael Kors, Pomellato, and Salvatore Ferragamo.

Agencies
Ford Models, New York
Women Model Management, Milan
VIVA Model Management, Paris
Ten Model Management, São Paulo

References

External links

https://www.instagram.com/flaoliveiraofficial/

Brazilian female models
Living people
People from Londrina
1983 births